Juvic Pagunsan (born 11 May 1978) is a professional golfer from the Philippines who plays on the Japan Golf Tour and the Asian Tour. He won the 2007 Pertamina Indonesia President Invitational on the Asian Tour and the 2021 Gateway to The Open Mizuno Open on the Japan Golf Tour.

Amateur career
Pagunsan had an illustrious amateur career with numerous victories that included the 2005 Philippine, Thailand and Malaysian Amateurs.

Pagunsan nearly won the 2004 Philippine Open as an amateur. He was a co-leader going into the final round, but settled for second place, three strokes behind the winner.

Professional career
Pagunsan turned professional in 2006 at the age of 27 and immediately qualified for the Asian Tour. He had 4 top-10s in his rookie season, and he made over $290,000 in earnings. This remains his most successful season on Tour financially. He had two wins on smaller venues in Asia in 2006 and 2007.

In 2007, Pagunsan won his first title on the Asian Tour at the Pertamina Indonesia President Invitational, where he finished birdie-eagle to defeat India's Gaganjeet Bhullar by a slim margin. He did not win an event in 2008, but had three top-10s including a second-place finish to Mo Joong-kyung at the Singha Thailand PGA Championship. In 2011, Pagunsan won the Asian Tour Order of Merit.

Since 2012 Pagunsan has played primarily on the Japan Golf Tour. His first win on the tour came at the 2021 Gateway to The Open Mizuno Open, having previously had a number of runner-up finishes, including the 2012 Japan Open Golf Championship, the 2013 and 2014 Indonesia PGA Championship, the 2014 Gateway to the Open Mizuno Open, the 2017 SMBC Singapore Open, the 2019 Shigeo Nagashima Invitational Sega Sammy Cup and the 2021 Asia-Pacific Diamond Cup Golf.

Pagunsan qualified for the 2020 Tokyo Olympics by making it to the Top 60 of the International Golf Federation Rankings.

Amateur highlights
2001 Kuala Lumpur SEA Games
2005 Manila SEA Games individual and team, Philippine Amateur, Thailand Amateur, Malaysian Amateur Open

Professional wins (24)

Japan Golf Tour wins (1)

*Note: The 2021 Gateway to The Open Mizuno Open was shortened to 54 holes due to rain.

Asian Tour wins (1)

Asian Tour playoff record (0–1)

Asian Development Tour wins (2)

1Co-sanctioned by the Philippine Golf Tour

ASEAN PGA Tour wins (1)

Philippine Golf Tour wins (16)

1Co-sanctioned by the Asian Development Tour

PGT Asia wins (2)

Other wins (2)
2006 The Country Club Invitational (Philippines)
2007 Negeri Masters (Malaysia)

Playoff record
European Tour playoff record (0–1)

Results in major championships

CUT = missed the half-way cut
"T" = tied

Results in World Golf Championships

"T" = Tied

Team appearances
Amateur
Eisenhower Trophy (representing the Philippines): 2000, 2002, 2004
Bonallack Trophy (representing Asia/Pacific): 2004 (winners)

References

External links

Filipino male golfers
Asian Tour golfers
Japan Golf Tour golfers
Olympic golfers of the Philippines
Golfers at the 2020 Summer Olympics
Golfers at the 2002 Asian Games
Southeast Asian Games medalists in golf
Southeast Asian Games gold medalists for the Philippines
Southeast Asian Games bronze medalists for the Philippines
Asian Games competitors for the Philippines
Competitors at the 2001 Southeast Asian Games
Competitors at the 2005 Southeast Asian Games
Sportspeople from Manila
1978 births
Living people